Angel Unigwe (born Angel Onyinyechi Unigwe; 27 June 2005) is a Nigerian actress, model, and presenter who has also featured in popular television commercials.

Career 
Introduced to the movie industry by her mum, Unigwe started as a child actor making her debut in 2015 after taking up roles in ‘Alison’s Stand,’ a popular Nigerian television series; and since then she has continued to warm the hearts of film audiences’. Unigwe's publicist is Nigerian journalist Obaji Akpet.

Filmography 
Unigwe has played several dominant roles in no fewer than 30 films produced in Nigeria, an industry adjudged to be the second-largest in the world after Bollywood. Some of the films Unigwe has featured in include ‘Woe man’, ‘Everything in Between’ series, ‘Middle of nowhere,’ ‘Light in the Dark,’ ‘Three Thieves,’ ‘Ajoche,’ ‘King of boys,’ ‘Code Wilo,’ ‘Mute,’ ‘Bereaved: Pains of Aliyah,’ ‘My Siblings and I,’ ‘Zuriel's Diary,’ ‘City Crimes,’ ‘Bobo A Rats Tale,’ ‘Nigerian trade,’ ‘Ten years Married: Mirage,’ ‘Freedah,’ among others.

In 2018, Unigwe starred in Light in The Dark, a movie produced and directed by Ekene Som Mekwunye that was released on 25 January the following year featuring Joke Silva, Rita Dominic, Kalu Ikeagwu, Ngozi Nwosu, Saidi Balogun, Kiki Omeili, Nonso Odogwu, Big Mickey and Prince Unigwe among a host of others.

In 2019, Unigwe played Fuwe in “Three Thieves”, written by the trio Sammy Egbemawei, Abba Makama, and Africa Ukoh. The movie released to the cinema in Nigeria on 4 October had Babtunwa Aderinokun and Uche Okocha as the Executive Producer and producer respectively.

In 2021 Unigwe starred in the television series “The Olive,” released in May 2021 directed by Yemi Morafa and produced by Esse Akwawa and Chidinma Igbokweuche.

Nominations and awards 
Unigwe has enjoyed several nominations and won numerous awards including the Child Actor of the Year 2019 at the Intellects Giant Award; carted home Best Young/Promising Actor on 27 October 2019, at the 2019 edition of the Africa Movie Academy Awards (AMAA);  Best Child Actress in a Movie at 2021 Best of Nollywood (BON) award for her role in ‘Strain’;

References 

21st-century Nigerian actresses
Nigerian child actresses
Actresses from Lagos
Living people
Nigerian film actresses
Nigerian female models
Nigerian television presenters
2005 births
Nigerian film award winners
Nigerian media personalities